Darren Malcolm Eadie (born 10 June 1975) is an English football manager and former professional footballer, who is joint-manager of Leiston.

As a player, he made his name as a pacy left-sided midfielder with Norwich City before later joining Leicester City. He featured in both the Premier League and Football League for both teams. He was capped seven times by England U21, scoring twice before being called up to the full England team in 1997. He was part of England's squad that took part in the Tournoi de France, where he was a substitute, and did not go on to win a full cap.

Early life
Born in Chippenham, Eadie attended the Corsham School in Wiltshire.

Club career
Eadie was a product of Norwich City's youth system and made his debut in a UEFA Cup match against Vitesse Arnhem in September 1993. By the time they were relegated at the end of the following season, he was Norwich's regular left winger. Even though he was unable to inspire Norwich to a return to the Premier League, his form for the club was such that his name was being linked with a number of Premier League clubs by 1997, although he would ultimately remain at Carrow Road for some three years more.

He missed the start of the 1999–2000 season through a knee injury, and in December 1999, as a result of Norwich's financial problems and risk or relegation, he was sold to Leicester City F.C. for almost £3 million, finally giving him the chance to establish himself as a Premier League player.

Eadie was to only play a total 40 matches for Leicester, this number being cut short due to repeated knee injuries, and he retired in the summer of 2003, aged 28. He was cup-tied for their victory in the 2000 Football League Cup Final.

International career
Between 1994 and 1997, Eadie made seven appearances for the England U21 team, scoring two goals.

In the summer of 1997, Eadie was called up to the England squad for the Tournoi de France.

Managerial career
In March 2020 Eadie was appointed joint manager of Leiston alongside Chris Wigger although Chris does most of the work.

Personal life
In 2002, Eadie was voted an inaugural member of the Norwich City Hall of Fame, which was established to celebrate the club's centenary. In an interview for the Norwich City matchday programme on 13 August 2005, Eadie stated that he had found retirement difficult, particularly as many of his friends were still playing professional football. It was reported in July 2012 that he had fought severe depression and suffered panic attacks.

Honours
Individual
First Division PFA Team of the Year: 1996–97

References

External links

Living people
1975 births
People from Chippenham
English footballers
Association football midfielders
England under-21 international footballers
Premier League players
Norwich City F.C. players
Leicester City F.C. players
English football managers
Leiston F.C. managers